Charles-Victor Sieg (8 August 1837 – 6 April 1899) was a French composer and organist. He won the 1864 Prix de Rome for his setting of the dramatic cantata, Ivanhoé.

Life and career
Sieg was born in Turckheim, a small town in the Alsace region of France. His father, Constant Sieg (1807 – 1891), was a composer and the organist of the Church of Saint-Martin in Colmar. Sieg studied first under his father and then at the Conservatoire de Paris under François Benoist (organ) and Ambroise Thomas (composition). He won the conservatory's First Prize in organ in 1863, and the following year he won the Prix de Rome for the cantata, Ivanhoé set to a French text by Victor Roussy based on Walter Scott's 1820 novel, Ivanhoe. The cantata premiered on 18 November 1864 at the Paris Opera with Jean Morère in the title role and was well received.

Ivanhoé proved to be Sieg's only major composition, although he later published several piano pieces including Trois Impromptus, Tarentelle and Caprice-Valse. After he returned from Rome where he had worked on composing an opéra-comique, he took up a post in Paris as organist at the church of Notre-Dame de Clignancourt and devoted himself to teaching. He also served as the organist of the Church of Saint-Merri and as the singing inspector for Paris city schools. Sieg died in Colmar in 1899 at the age of 61. Rue Victor Sieg, a street in Turckheim, is named in his honour.

Notes

References

1837 births
1899 deaths
19th-century French composers
19th-century French male musicians
Conservatoire de Paris alumni
French classical organists
French male composers
French male organists
Prix de Rome for composition
Male classical organists
19th-century organists